James Chase (c. 1650 – 23 June 1721), of Westhorpe House, Little Marlow, Buckinghamshire. was an English apothecary and Whig politician who sat in the English and British House of Commons from 1690 to 1710. From 1690 he was Court apothecary to King William III, Queen Anne and King George I.

Early life

Chase was the eldest son of John Chase of Littlebrook, Kent and his wife Elizabeth Soane, daughter of Dr Thomas Soane, canon of Windsor. His father was court apothecary to Charles II, and James II, having  succeeded his own father in 1666, who was court apothecary to  Charles I and, after the Restoration, to Charles II. Chase matriculated at Christ Church, Oxford on 15 December 1665, aged 15.  He married Elizabeth Box, daughter of Sir Ralph Box of Cheapside, London on 17 November 1677. In 1684, he acquired his estate in Little Marlow and built Westhorpe House there during Queen Anne's reign.

Court apothecary
Chase was a Freeman of the Apothecaries’ Company and was its Master from June 1688 to September 1689. His father's patent granted the reversion of the office to Chase himself, and after his father's death in 1690, Chase became court apothecary to William III in June 1690, at an annual salary of £115, with an annual allowance of £127  and lodgings in Whitehall. He was subsequently court apothecary to Queen Anne and King George I.

Political career
At the 1690 English general election Chase was returned as Member of Parliament for  Great Marlow in Buckinghamshire. He was returned again unopposed in 1695, 1698 and in the two general elections of 1701. He was unopposed again at the 1702 English general election and 1705 English general election. In June 1706 he was appointed a commissioner for sick and wounded, but resigned the following May. At the 1708 British general election he was returned in a contest as a Whig. He voted for the naturalization of the Palatines in 1709 and for  the impeachment of Dr Sacheverell in 1710. At the 1710 British general election he was mixed up in a double return and waived his right of election on 8 December 1710. He was defeated at Marlow at the 1715 British general election.

Death and legacy
Chase died without issue on 23 June  1721 leaving his estate  to his widow and Dr Stephen Chase, the eldest son of his cousin, also Stephen Chase.

Notes

British MPs 1707–1708
British MPs 1708–1710
English MPs 1690–1695
English MPs 1695–1698
English MPs 1698–1700
English MPs 1702–1705
English MPs 1705–1707
Apothecaries
Members of the Parliament of Great Britain for English constituencies
Members of the Parliament of Great Britain for Oxford University
1717 deaths
1636 births